Werner Dörflinger (2 October 1940 – 2 March 2021) was a German politician of the Christian Democratic Union (CDU) and a former member of the German Bundestag.

Life 
Dörflinger joined the CDU in 1961 and was chairman of the Waldshut district association of the Junge Union for ten years. Within the CDU he was deputy chairman from 1967 to 1991 and chairman of the Waldshut district association from 1991 to 1993. He was elected to the city council of Tiengen in 1965 and confirmed in 1971. In 1975 he also moved into the council of the newly formed city of Waldshut-Tiengen. Since 1994 he was again a member of the city council. From 1989 to 1994 he was a member of the Waldshut County Council.

He was a member of the German Bundestag for five election periods from 4 November 1980 to 26 October 1998. He was elected directly for the CDU in the Waldshut constituency. In the Bundestag, he had been chairman of the Committee for Regional Planning, Building and Urban Development since February 1992.

References

External links 

1940 births
2021 deaths
Members of the Bundestag for Baden-Württemberg
Members of the Bundestag 1994–1998
Members of the Bundestag 1990–1994
Members of the Bundestag 1987–1990
Members of the Bundestag 1983–1987
Members of the Bundestag 1980–1983
Members of the Bundestag for the Christian Democratic Union of Germany
People from Waldshut-Tiengen